Mafry Balang (born on 26 March 1984 in Sipitang, Sabah) is a Malaysian footballer who plays for Sabah in Malaysia Premier League. He plays mainly as a centre back, although he can operate occasionally as a defensive midfielder.

Mafry spent most of his career with Sabah for five years. Nicknamed 'Iron Man' by Sabahawk fan supporter due to his tough-tackler, Mafry is a versatile player who can play anywhere on defence, including a more defensive minded midfield role.

Club career

Sabah
Mafry helped Sabah qualify to the 2010 Malaysia Super League under Manager Gary Phillips. He can plays in various position as defender, centre back and defensive midfielder. The Sabahawks fans called him "Iron Man". He is also co-captain for the Sabah.

After the meetings held by Sabah FA management, they made the final decision to released Mafry Balang with 13 other players for the 2013 Malaysian league.

Kelantan
Mafry joined Kelantan as a loan player for 2012 Malaysia Cup campaign with Afiq Azmi and Mohd Aslam Haja Najmudeen. They had helped Kelantan grab the 2012 Malaysia Cup throphy for the second times.

Sarawak
For the 2013 Malaysia Premier League, he had joined Sarawak and won the league.

Penang
After spending two seasons with Sarawak, Mafry joined Penang for the 2015 season. As of 8 June 2017, he was appointed as the captain for Penang team.

Honours

Clubs
Kelantan
 Malaysia Cup: 2012

Sarawak
 Malaysia Premier League: 2013

Penang
 Malaysia Premier League: Promotion 2015

Sabah
 Malaysia Premier League: 2019

References

External links
 

1984 births
Living people
Malaysian footballers
People from Sabah
Sabah F.C. (Malaysia) players
Malacca FA players
Kelantan FA players
Sarawak FA players
Penang F.C. players
Malaysia Super League players
Association football defenders
Association football midfielders